Robert Couturier (born 1955) is a French architect and decorator best known for designing Cuixmala, an eco-luxury resort that was formerly the estate of British-French billionaire Sir James Goldsmith.

Biography

A graduate, the École Camondo, in Paris, with a degree in interior architecture and design, Robert Couturier moved to New York in 1981. He quickly established his own practice, which has been recognized in prestigious annual lists of the best decorators and architectural firms by Architectural Digest, Elle Décor, 1stDibs, and House and Garden, among others. In June 2012, Elle Decor included Couturier in its A-list Top 60 Designers, and British House & Garden named him one of the top 10 foreign decorators. In 2021, Architectural Digest inducted Couturier into the AD100 Hall of Fame.

In 1987, a relatively inexperienced Couturier was entrusted by the financier Sir James Goldsmith with the single greatest private commission of modern times: the re-conception, execution, and continuous embellishment of Goldsmith's 30,000-acre nature reserve on the Pacific Coast of Mexico. Crowned by a 60,000-square-foot vaulted-and-tile-domed hilltop palace called La Loma, the estate came to encompass vast satellite villas and assorted guest pavilions. He went on to decorate Goldsmith's Boeing 757 ("a flying carpet with a motor"), his double-width Manhattan townhouse, and his historic French chateau.

Two and a half decades later, the New York-based Couturier continues to execute grand-scale commissions in the U.S., Europe, and South America. Today his name has become synonymous with continental and international style and elegance working with clients such as Anne Hearst and Jay McInerney, Cecile David Weil, Frederick Iseman, Frédéric Fekkai, and Vanity Fair special correspondent Amy Fine Collins.

Couturier has contributed to major architecture and design books and in October 2014, released his first monograph Robert Couturier: Designing Paradises with Rizzoli New York, showcasing a beautiful range of multifaceted work. His work has been featured in publications such as Architectural Digest, Vogue, Vanity Fair, Town and Country, the New York Times, Condé Nast Traveler, House and Garden, The Robb Report, Elle Décor, and The Wall Street Journal.

He previously lived in Connecticut with his partner, Jeffrey Morgan. He now resides in New York City.

References

External links
Robert Couturier's website
Interview with Robert Couturier on The Business of Home Podcast

Living people
20th-century French architects
21st-century French architects
French interior designers
1955 births